Wolfgang Altmann (born 22 September 1952) is a German former professional footballer who played as a midfielder.

References

External links

1952 births
Living people
German footballers
FC Sachsen Leipzig players
1. FC Lokomotive Leipzig players
East German footballers
DDR-Oberliga players
Association football midfielders
People from Markranstädt
Footballers from Saxony